Aston on Clun is a village in south Shropshire, England.

It lies near to the River Clun, with the brook from Hopesay flowing through the village itself, and is on the B4368 road between the towns of Clun and Craven Arms. The village of Broome, which has a railway station, is also close by. It is in the civil parish of Hopesay.

Amenities
There is a public house, the "Kangaroo Inn" (named after a 19th-century Atlantic "cable runner" ship) and next door a small car garage. Until recently, the village had a post office and, since 2013, the village has had a small convenience shop once again, now located by the village hall.

To the rear of the village hall is a large (modern) village green.

Attractions
At the centre of the village lies an Arbor Tree, which usually has flags ceremonially held amongst its branches. The village still celebrates Arbor Day, a tree dressing ceremony related to Oak Apple Day, annually on the last Sunday in May.

History
In 1949 the Oaker Estate was wound up and auctioned off in small plots as lots. The estate covered almost all of the village and surrounding countryside, including the Kangaroo Inn which was lot number 1. Inside the pub today the original maps, auction documents and deeds of the Oaker Estate sale can be seen.

The present-day post town is Craven Arms; previously Aston on Clun was a post town itself.

See also
Listed buildings in Hopesay

References

External links

Villages in Shropshire